This is a List of Romanian films released in 2009.

Lists of 2009 films by country or language
2009
2009 in Romanian cinema